General Union of Neighbourhood Associations of Macau, or in short Neighbourhood Union ( or ), is a pro-Beijing political party in Macau, and is represented in the Legislative Assembly.

History 
The General Union of Neighbourhood Associations of Macau (GUNA) was formed on 30 December 1983, based on the urgent need of unity among Macanese following the social changes brought by the Chinese Government's reform policies. The GUNA provided services ranging from child to elderly care, and from education to community basic services. It was regarded as part of the traditional faction within the pro-Beijing camp.

The GUNA first fielded candidates in 1988 legislative election and won. Electoral alliance was formed with other pro-Beijing parties by 1991 under the name of "Progress Promotion Union", and has won every elections since then.

The GUNA is one of the three major pro-Beijing organisations which have dominated politics in Macau since the 1999 handover, the other two being the Macau Chinese Chamber of Commerce and the Macau Federation of Trade Unions.

Leadership 
The leadership of the 17th Council and Supervisory Board members:

 Leader: Ng Siu-lai
 Chairperson: Chan Ka-leong
 Secretary-general:

Electoral performance

See also 
Progress Promotion Union, child party

References 

Political parties in Macau